Sherbrooke may refer to:

Places 
 Australia
 Sherbrooke, Victoria, a town
 Sherbrooke Forest, in Victoria
 Shire of Sherbrooke, a former  local government area of Victoria
 Electoral district of Sherbrooke

 Canada
 Sherbrooke, a city in Quebec
 Sherbrooke Regional County Municipality, a former name of the now-defunct La Région-Sherbrookoise Regional County Municipality
 Sherbrooke (electoral district), a federal electoral district
 Sherbrooke (provincial electoral district), a provincial electoral district of Quebec
 Town of Sherbrooke, a past federal electoral district from 1867 to 1925
 Sherbrooke Airport
 Université de Sherbrooke
 Sherbrooke, Edmonton, a neighbourhood in Edmonton, Alberta
 Sherbrooke, Nova Scotia, a small rural community in Nova Scotia
 Sherbrooke, Prince Edward Island, a small settlement in Prince Edward Island
 Sherbrooke Street, a major road in Montreal
 Sherbrooke (Montreal Metro), a Montreal Metro station
 Sherbrooke Township, Ontario
 Roman Catholic Archdiocese of Sherbrooke

 United States
 Sherbrooke, North Dakota

People 
 John Coape Sherbrooke (1764–1830), British soldier and colonial administrator
 Robert Sherbrooke (1901–1972), English recipient of the Victoria Cross
 Robert Lowe, 1st Viscount Sherbrooke (1811–1892), British and Australian statesman

Other uses 
 , a ship of the Royal Canadian Navy during the Second World War
 Sir John Sherbrooke, one of two privateer vessels by the same name during the War of 1812

See also 
 Sherbrooke Lake (disambiguation)